John Leo Mokan (September 23, 1895 – February 10, 1985) was a Major League Baseball outfielder. He batted and threw right-handed.

A native of Buffalo, New York, Mokan made his major league debut on April 15, 1921 at the age of 25. He spent seven seasons in the National League with the Pittsburgh Pirates (1921–22) and Philadelphia Phillies (1923–27).

Mokan was a .291 career hitter with 32 home runs and 273 RBI in 582 games. His most productive season came in 1923 when he posted career-highs in batting average (.313), home runs (10), runs (76) and doubles (23). He had another good season in 1926, hitting .303 with career-highs in RBI (62), hits (138), triples (5) and games played (135). Mokan played his final game on October 2, 1927.

He died in Buffalo, New York at age 89.

External links

Johnny Mokan - Baseballbiography.com

1895 births
1985 deaths
Major League Baseball outfielders
Pittsburgh Pirates players
Philadelphia Phillies players
Baseball players from Buffalo, New York
Fort Dodge Gypsumites players